Shailendra (IAST: Śailendra) is a Sanskrit combined words Śaila and Indra, meaning "King of the Mountain", It is often used as an epithet of the Hindu god Shiva. It is commonly used as a male given name in the Indian subcontinent. Shailendra may refer to:

People
 Shailendra Gaur, Indian actor
 Shailendra Kumar (born 1960), Samajwadi Party politician from Uttar Pradesh
 Shailendra Kumar Upadhyaya (1929–2011), Nepali politician
 Shailendra (lyricist)  (1923-1966), Shankardas Kesarilal
 Shailendra Mahato (1929–2011), Jharkhand politician
 Shailendra Mohan Singhal, Bharatiya Janata Party politician from Uttarakhand
 Shailendra Nath Shrivastava (1936–2006), Lok Sabha member from Bihar
 Shailendra Raj Mehta (born 1959), Indian economist
 Shailendra Singh (police officer), Indian former police officer
 Shailendra Singh (singer) (born 1952), Indian playback singer

Other
 Shailendra dynasty, an influential Indonesian dynasty that emerged in 8th century Java

Indian masculine given names
Hindu given names